Mustafabad, Faizabad is a village within Faizabad district. Mustafabad is located 30 km from Faizabad district headquarters and 100 km from Uttar Pradesh state capital Lucknow.

Mustafabad is on the name of Mustafahusain urf Bare who was from Iran. The official name of Baragaon is "Mustafabad".

The whole area is very fertile. There are many large mango gardens in the village. There is regular market besides Tuesday, Friday market. This twice-weekly market is under the patronage of Anjuman Zeenatul watan Mustafabad.

Culture
Baragaon has an agricultural village and multi-religion society. People of different religions live in harmony with each other. They celebrate each festival without any discrimination.

The main festivals are Holi, Deepawali, Eid, Eid-ul Zuha, Durgapuja, Moharram Mahashivratri and In and In Durgapuja and Moharram, any one can see a real picture of unity of India where Muslims and Hindus are participating equally and blessing to each other.

There are many temples: Hanuman Garhi situated in main market of the village, Kali Mandir situated in the main market in the village, and Mosques. Some historical buildings are also there like Imam Bara and One Shiv Mandir where very old age nearly 100 + years and Dildarjahan ka Imamabara are historic.
Late Mansab Ali handwritten Quran are of antique class.

Villages in Faizabad district